Glen Flora may refer to the following places in the United States:

Glen Flora, Wisconsin
Glen Flora, Texas